Olentangy Orange High School is a public high school in Lewis Center, Ohio, United States. It is part of the Olentangy Local School District.

Ohio High School Athletic Association State Championships 

 Girls Golf - 2016 
 Girls Golf - 2017

Notable alumni 
 Zach Harrison, football player

See also
Olentangy High School
Olentangy Liberty High School
Olentangy Berlin High School

References

External links 
 

High schools in Delaware County, Ohio
Public high schools in Ohio